Belfast Operatic Company (BOC) is an amateur company that performs musicals and concerts throughout Ireland. It was founded in 1960 by John Mercer in Belfast, Northern Ireland.

The company performed the Irish première of Titanic the Musical in 2005, for which it won awards from the Association of Irish Musical Societies (AIMS), and again in 2007. BOC performs several shows each year at the Grand Opera House, Belfast. In May 2009, the company performed a sell-out run of the musical, Hello, Dolly!, obtaining positive reviews and earning the lead role, Dolly Levi, played by Laura Kerr, a nomination for Best Actress from AIMS.

In 2009, BOC moved into a new purpose-built rehearsal studio located in East Belfast, with modern facilities, multiple rehearsal rooms and a social area to congregate after rehearsals. The company has over 100 members who meet each Monday evening to prepare for their busy concert schedule.

In March 2010, the company's 50th year in production, Belfast Operatic Company performed Beauty and the Beast at the Grand Opera House in Belfast.

In March 2023, BOC will perform Disney's The Hunchback of Notre Dame and recently announced The Phantom of The Opera as their headline show in 2024.

Key people
The following are key members:

 President – Thompie Steele
 Chairman – Colin Boyd
 Secretary – Gary Redpath
 Treasurer – Elizabeth Boyd
 Musical Director – Adam Darcy

Gallery
Photographs from Hello, Dolly! at the Grand Opera House, Belfast, May 2009:

References

1960 establishments in Northern Ireland
Musical groups established in 1960
Musical theatre companies
Amateur theatre companies in the United Kingdom
Music organisations based in Northern Ireland
Entertainment in Belfast
Music in Belfast